The Men's football tournament at the 2019 Military World Games was held in Wuhan in China from 16 to 27 October.

Group stage

Group A

Group B

Group C

Knockout stage

Quarter-finals

Semi-finals

Bronze medal match

Gold medal match

External links
Football tournament of the 7th Military World Games  - Official website of the 2019 Military World Games

Football Men
Military World Games
2019 men
2019 men